Gymnothorax nudivomer, the starry moray or yellowmouth moray, is a species of marine fish in the family Muraenidae.

Description
The starry moray is a large sized fish that can reach a maximum length of 180 cm, but the ones usually observed are rather smaller.
Its serpentine in shape body has a brown background color dotted with small white spots circled with darker brown than its background color.
The size of these spots is relatively small at the head and is getting larger toward the tail.
One of the characteristic point to identify this moray is the yellow color of its inside mouth.
The gills aperture is brown dark.

Distribution and habitat
The starry moray is widespread throughout the Indo-Pacific area from eastern coast of Africa, Red Sea included, until Polynesia and Hawaii and from south Japan to New Caledonia.

Biology
The starry moray is solitary and carnivorous, it leaves its lair at night to actively hunt its preys along the reef. It mainly feeds on fishes.

References

External links
 
 Fishes of Australia : Gymnothorax nudivomer

nudivomer
Marine fish of Northern Australia
Fish described in 1867
Taxa named by Albert Günther